This is a list of circuits which have hosted a World Championship race from  to .

In total, 73 different circuits have hosted World Championship races. The TT Circuit Assen has the distinction of holding the most races, holding a Grand Prix every year (with the exception of ) since .

Various different forms of race track have been used throughout the history of the World Championship; purpose-built race tracks such as Suzuka, road tracks such as Spa-Francorchamps and city street tracks such as Montjuïc.

List of circuits

 The "Map" column shows a diagram of the latest configuration on current tracks and the last configuration used on past tracks.
 The "Type" column refers to the type of circuit: "street" is a circuit held on closed city streets, "road" refers to a mixture of public roads and a permanent track, and "race" is a permanent facility.

Notes

 
Circuits
Grand Prix motorcycle